Jungle Queen (1945) is a Universal movie serial.

Material from this serial was re-edited into the feature film Jungle Safari (1956).

Plot
In 1939, Nazi Germany sends a team of agents to incite revolt and seize British Middle Africa as a first step in conquering Africa.  Attempting to place their own sympathiser in charge of the local tribe, they face resistance from Pamela Courtney searching for her Uncle Allen Courtney, a pair of American volunteers and the mysterious Jungle Queen Lothel, who appears out of nowhere in her nightgown to give advice and instructions to the tribe.

Cast
 Edward Norris as Bob Elliot
 Eddie Quillan as Chuck Kelly
 Douglass Dumbrille as Lang, the Nazi villain
 Lois Collier as Pamela Courtney
 Ruth Roman as Lothel, Jungle Queen
 Tala Birell as Dr. Elise Bork
 Clarence Muse as Kyba
 Cy Kendall as Tambosa Tim
 Clinton Rosemond as Godac
 Lumsden Hare as Mr X
 Lester Matthews as Commissioner Braham Chatterton
 Napoleon Simpson as Maati
 Budd Buster as Jungle Jack
 Emmett Smith as Noma
 James Baskett as Orbon

Critical reception
Cline writes that "although well produced, it often became bogged down with complicated plot twists, psychological debates and confusion as to who was on whose side, and what was really being accomplished."  The Jungle Queen herself is never adequately explained.

Chapter titles
 Invitation to Danger
 Jungle Sacrifice
 The Flaming Mountain
 Wildcat Stampede
 The Burning Jungle
 Danger Ship
 Trip-wire Murder
 The Mortar Bomb
 Death Watch
 Execution Chamber
 The Trail of Doom
 Dragged Under
 The Secret of the Sword!
Source:

Production
The serial reuses aircraft footage from Five Came Back (1939) as well as volcano and crocodile attack footage from East of Borneo (1931).

See also
 List of film serials by year
 List of film serials by studio

References

External links
 
 

1945 films
1945 adventure films
World War II films made in wartime
American black-and-white films
1940s English-language films
Jungle girls
Universal Pictures film serials
Films directed by Ray Taylor
Films directed by Lewis D. Collins
Films set in Africa
Films set in 1939
African theatres of World War II
American adventure films
Films with screenplays by George H. Plympton